Gamma Mensae, Latinized from γ Mensae, is an orange-hued star system in the southern constellation of Mensa. The apparent visual magnitude of 5.19 indicates it is dimly visible to the naked eye. Based upon an annual parallax shift of 7.70 mas as seen from the Earth, it is about 102 light years from the Sun. At that distance, the visual magnitude is diminished by an extinction factor of 0.033 due to interstellar dust. The system shows the high velocity kinematic properties of a population II star, but has Sun-like abundances of most elements.

This is a probable astrometric binary system with poorly constrained orbital elements. The visible member, component A, is an evolved K-type giant star with a stellar classification K2 III At about 10.6 billion years of age, it has nearly the same mass as the Sun but has expanded to five times the Sun's radius. The star shines with 21 times the Sun's luminosity from its enlarged photosphere at an effective temperature of 4,491 K.

References

K-type giants
Astrometric binaries
Mensa (constellation)
Mensae, Gamma
Durchmusterung objects
037763
025918
1953